Strzegom  is a village in the administrative district of Gmina Rytwiany, within Staszów County, Świętokrzyskie Voivodeship, in south-central Poland.

The village has a population of  495.

Demography 
According to the 2002 Poland census, there were 518 people residing in Strzegom village, of whom 49.4% were male and 50.6% were female. In the village, the population was spread out, with 31.1% under the age of 18, 36.9% from 18 to 44, 15.3% from 45 to 64, and 16.8% who were 65 years of age or older.
 Figure 1. Population pyramid of village in 2002 — by age group and sex

References

Villages in Staszów County